University of Horticultural Sciences, Bagalkot is a public university exclusively dedicated to the study and research of Horticultural Sciences established by the Government of Karnataka at Bagalkot district. Realizing the importance of Horticulture and the need for research and development support for its further expansion, the University of Horticultural Sciences, Bagalkot was established by the Government of Karnataka through a special ordinance (no.2 of 2008) on 22/11/2008 and duly enacted by Karnataka Act no-11 of 2010 dated 13/05/2010.

Headquarters
Bagalkot was chosen for its headquarters as the district is known for its rich horticultural production base of grapes, pomegranate, banana, guava, fig, lime, sapota, ber, vegetables, beetle vine, coconut, spices, and medicinal plants. The district is surrounded by Belgaum in the west, Dharwad and Koppal in the south, Bijapur in the north, and Raichur in the east, which are hubs for the production of grape, mango, pomegranate, flowers and vegetables. The area has a congenial climate for all kinds of crops besides its rich historical and cultural heritage making it an ideal place for the university. The mighty Almatti Dam is a backbone for both agri- and horticultural activity.

Colleges
It has the following colleges:
College of Horticulture, Bidar
College of Horticulture, Bagalkote
College of Horticulture, Bangalore
College of Horticulture, Sirsi
College of Horticulture, Kolar
College of Horticulture, Mysore
College of Horticulture, Munirabad
KRRCH, Arabhavi, Belagavi
CHEFT, Devihosur, Haveri

See also 
 University of Agricultural Sciences, Dharwad
 University of Agricultural and Horticultural Sciences, Shimoga
 University of Agricultural Sciences, Raichur
 University of Agricultural Sciences, Bangalore

References

External links 
 Official Website

Universities in Karnataka
Universities and colleges in Bagalkot district
Horticultural organisations based in India